Recontraloca is a 2019 Peruvian comedy film directed by Giovanni Ciccia (in his directorial debut) and written by Nicolás López. It is a remake of the 2016 Chilean film No Filter. Starring Gianella Neyra. It was released on August 8, 2019, in Peruvian theaters.

Synopsis 
Adriana, a 38-year-old woman overwhelmed by the mistreatment of her boss, her husband, her stepson, her competition at work, among other people with which are related on a daily basis. Until one day, desperate, she visits a strange healer. Outcome? He will do and say everything he ever thought without filters, which will lead to hilarious situations.

Cast 
The actors participating in this film are:

 Gianella Neyra as Adriana
 Rebeca Escribens as Mrs. Auto
 Paul Vega as Antonio
 Santiago Suárez as Nicolás
 Chiara Pinasco as Maria Paz
 Nicolás Galindo as Sebastian
 Rossana Fernández Maldonado as Dani
 Franco Cabrera as Neighbour
 Giovanni Ciccia as Gabriel
 Alessandra Fuller as Teffi

Reception 
Recontraloca was seen by more than 104,000 people in its first weekend. Within a month of its release, the film was seen by more than 500,000 people.

References

External links 

 

2019 films
2019 comedy films
Peruvian comedy films
La Soga Producciones films
2010s Spanish-language films
2010s Peruvian films
Films set in Peru
Films shot in Peru
Films about labour
Films about labor relations
2019 directorial debut films
Remakes of Chilean films